Atelopus boulengeri, Boulenger's stubfoot toad, is a small species of toad in the family Bufonidae endemic to humid montane forest in southern Ecuador. It has not been seen since 1984, but some of the known sites have not been well surveyed, so it may still survive. The threats are habitat loss and the disease chytridiomycosis.

References

boulengeri
Amphibians of Ecuador
Amphibians described in 1904
Taxonomy articles created by Polbot